Tanya Dubnicoff (born November 7, 1969 in Winnipeg, Manitoba) is a Canadian cycling coach and retired track cyclist. She won four gold medals at the Pan American Games. She represented Canada at three consecutive Summer Olympics: 1992 in Barcelona, 1996 in Atlanta and 2000 in Sydney. Dubnicoff retired in 2000.

She was inducted into the Manitoba Sports Hall of Fame and Museum in 2002. Dubnicoff was inducted into Cycling Canada's Hall of Fame in 2015.

Coaching

Dubnicoff was named as Cycling Canada's Advancement Camp Coach based out of Calgary to start January 1, 2022. Previously, Dubnicoff was a National Team head coach with Cycling Canada from 2011 to 2013, helping Canada to a bronze medal in Women's Team Pursuit at the 2012 Summer Olympics in London.

References

External links
 Canadian Olympic Committee
Tanya Dubnicoff’s biography at Manitoba Sports Hall of Fame and Museum

1969 births
Living people
Canadian female cyclists
Cyclists at the 1991 Pan American Games
Cyclists at the 1992 Summer Olympics
Cyclists at the 1994 Commonwealth Games
Cyclists at the 1995 Pan American Games
Cyclists at the 1996 Summer Olympics
Cyclists at the 1999 Pan American Games
Cyclists at the 1998 Commonwealth Games
Cyclists at the 2000 Summer Olympics
Olympic cyclists of Canada
Sportspeople from Winnipeg
UCI Track Cycling World Champions (women)
Pan American Games gold medalists for Canada
Commonwealth Games medallists in cycling
Commonwealth Games gold medallists for Canada
Pan American Games medalists in cycling
Canadian track cyclists
Medalists at the 1991 Pan American Games
Medalists at the 1995 Pan American Games
Medallists at the 1994 Commonwealth Games
Medallists at the 1998 Commonwealth Games